Caddebostan Synagogue is a synagogue built in 1953 in the Kadıköy district of Istanbul, Turkey. The name of the architect is Albert Arditi. As a result of the increase of the Jewish population in the area, the Synagogue is the most populated one on the Asian side of the city and visits and participation in prayers is possible by contacting the Chief Rabbinate.
The synagogue was active with the demand made to the Turkish authorities by the Chief Rabbinate on the 1 April 1961.

See also
 History of the Jews in Turkey
 List of synagogues in Turkey

References and notes

External links
 Chief Rabbinate of Turkey
 Shalom Newspaper - The main Jewish newspaper in Turkey

 

Synagogues in Istanbul
Synagogues completed in 1953
Kadıköy
20th-century religious buildings and structures in Turkey